Sciapus pallens is a species of long-legged fly in the family Dolichopodidae. It is found in Europe.

References

Sciapodinae
Articles created by Qbugbot
Insects described in 1830
Taxa named by Christian Rudolph Wilhelm Wiedemann